Hedong District is a township-level district (akin to a subdistrict) of Sanya, Hainan, People's Republic of China. , it has 12 residential communities and two villages under its administration.

See also
List of township-level divisions of Hainan

References

Township-level divisions of Hainan